Martha Tarhemba is a Nigerian football midfielder. She was part of the Nigeria women's national football team at the 2000 Summer Olympics.

See also
 Nigeria at the 2000 Summer Olympics

References

1978 births
Living people
Nigerian women's footballers
Place of birth missing (living people)
Footballers at the 2000 Summer Olympics
Olympic footballers of Nigeria
Women's association football midfielders
Nigeria women's international footballers
1999 FIFA Women's World Cup players
Pelican Stars F.C. players